Palestine–Wheatley School District is a public school district based in Palestine, Arkansas, United States. The Palestine–Wheatley School District encompasses  of land including all or portions of St. Francis County and Monoroe County communities including Palestine, Wheatley, Colt, Goodwin, and Brinkley.

The school district provides early childhood, elementary and secondary education for more than 800 prekindergarten through grade 12 at two schools, which are accredited by the Arkansas Department of Education (ADE).

History 
It was established by the July 1, 1987 merger of the Palestine School District and the Wheatley School District.

In 1966 the St. Francis County School District merged into the Palestine School District.

Schools 
 Palestine–Wheatley High School (Palestine)—grades seven through 12.
 Palestine–Wheatley Elementary School (Palestine)—prekindergarten through grade six.

References

Further reading 
  (Download) - Includes maps of predecessor districts

External links 
 

School districts in Arkansas
Education in St. Francis County, Arkansas
Education in Ashley County, Arkansas
1987 establishments in Arkansas
School districts established in 1987